Shahid Qureshi (1938 – 2 September 2013) was a Pakistani cricketer. He played twenty first-class cricket matches for several domestic teams in Pakistan between 1954 and 1965.A motorcycle accident brought an end to his cricketing career. He moved to the USA with his family and spent many years in the Chicago and Houston areas. He left behind a wife, daughter, son and 6 grandchildren.

References

External links
 

1936 births
2013 deaths
Pakistani cricketers
Karachi cricketers
Lahore cricketers
Pakistan International Airlines cricketers
Railways cricketers
Quetta cricketers
Sindh cricketers
Place of birth missing